The  is a series of Japanese tokusatsu programs which was produced by Toei Company and was aired by Fuji TV from 9:00 am to 9:30 am on Sunday.

Features
This series is known as various superheroes similar to the Kamen Rider Series, Super Sentai, and Metal Hero Series. However, these shows mainly focus on cute robots similar to Robocon, cute and unusual creatures, masked individuals who get tracked down by school children, and magical girls.

Each one is supposed to invoke mysterious humor; hence the name fushigi, which means "mystery" in Japanese. This series of programs was shown throughout the 1980s and ended in the early 1990s. All these programs were created by Shotaro Ishinomori, creator of the Kamen Rider, Super Sentai and Robocon series of manga and tokusatsu, as well as many other Toei Superheroes.

This series is divided into three subcategories:
 Robot and extra terrestrials : from Robot 8-chan to Morimori Bokkun.
 Children's detective team : Hardgumi and Maringumi.
 Magical girl : from Magical Chinese Girl Paipai! to Keeping-Words Sisters Chouchoutrian

Especially, the subcategory magical girl is known as "a gateway to female entertainers", female entertainers who starred in this magical girl series were selected for variety shows and anime theme songs after this series. Among them, Wakako Shimazaki who starred in "Magical Chinese Girl Ipanema!" has survived in the entertainment world until today in 2021.
 Wakako Shimazaki : "Magical Chinese Girl Ipanema!" (July 1989) → "All-Star Thanksgiving" and "Moero! Top Striker" (October 1991)
 Sanae Horikawa : "Mysterious Nile Girl Thutmose" (January 1991) → "Rokudenashi Blues" (July 1993)

List of series
  - Aired from October 4, 1981, to September 26, 1982
  - Aired from October 3, 1982, to September 25, 1983
  - Aired from October 2, 1983 to August 26, 1984
  - Aired from September 2, 1984, to March 31, 1985
  - Aired from April 7, 1985, to March 30, 1986
  - Aired from April 6 to December 28, 1986
  - Aired from January 11 to December 27, 1987
  - Aired from January 10, 1988, to January 1, 1989
  - Aired from January 9 to July 9, 1989. Starring Natsuki Ozawa.
  - Aired from July 23 to December 24, 1989. Starring Wakako Shimazaki.
  - Aired from January 7 to December 30, 1990. Starring Yūko Hanajima.
  - Aired from January 6 to December 29, 1991. Starring Sanae Horikawa.
  - Aired from January 5 to December 27, 1992
  - Aired from January 10 to October 31, 1993

See also
 Socialite Belle Panchanne: The Wife Is a Superheroine!
 A syndicated series that aired from April 3 to June 26, 2007 that parodied the Fushigi Comedy Series, particularly "La Belle Fille Masquée Poitrine".
 Rie Shibata : A recurring member of this series.
 Shigeru Saiki : A recurring member of this series and actor of Morio Makino in GoGo Sentai Boukenger.

Toei tokusatsu
Shotaro Ishinomori
Tokusatsu television series
Fuji TV original programming
Bandai brands